Invisible Scarlet O'Neil is a 1940-1956 American comic strip written and drawn by Russell Stamm, who had previously been an assistant to Chester Gould on Dick Tracy. The strip focused on Scarlet O'Neil, a plainclothes superhero (and one of the first superheroines) with the power of invisibility.

Publication history 
Originally published by the Chicago Daily Times and distributed by its syndication service, Invisible Scarlet O'Neil began on June 3, 1940. In September 1949, the title of the strip was reduced to simply Scarlet O'Neil, and her invisibility powers were seen much more rarely. 

Starting September 13, 1954, Emery Clarke drew the strip from Stamm's scripts. The title was changed again to Stainless Steel on October 24, 1954, and the character of Scarlet was dropped. The strip ended in 1956.

Characters and story 

Scarlet used her power of invisibility mostly to help out strangers in need and help the police catch dangerous criminals, as explained by comics historian Don Markstein:

In other media 
Scarlet O'Neil also appeared in a comic book series published by Harvey Comics, as well as Big Little Books, and a 1943 prose novel. Atlantis Studios in 2007 published a one-shot comic book Untold Origins of Invisible Scarlet O'Neil on the history of the character. In 2017 Babes With Blades premiered a play by Barbara Lhota based on the strip.

Graphic novel
In 2012 New Legends Productions published a graphic novel with a contemporary setting written by the son of the creator, Russell Stamm Jr., and artwork by Wendell Cavalcanti (pencils), Rob Jones and Elton Thomasi (inks).

References

External links
Russell Stamm's Invisible Scarlet O'Neil official site

1940 comics debuts
1956 comics endings
American comics characters
American comic strips
American superheroes
Comics about women
Comics characters introduced in 1940
Female characters in comics
Fiction about invisibility
Fictional characters who can turn invisible
Golden Age superheroes
Female superheroes
Superhero comic strips
Comic strip superheroes